The Concordia University Netanyahu riot occurred on September 9, 2002 on the Sir George Williams Campus of Concordia University in Montreal, Quebec, Canada, when student rioters opposed a visit from the then former (and later subsequent) Israeli Prime Minister Benjamin Netanyahu. The visit, to be held at noon at the Henry F. Hall Building, was canceled after pro-Palestinian students and Netanyahu supporters violently clashed.

Jewish student organization Hillel had invited Netanyahu to speak on campus. Several hundred demonstrators blocked attendees of the event from entering the building.

The attendees were escorted to the auditorium where the lecture was to take place, and later said the rioters had subjected them to antisemitic slogans and assault. Thomas Hecht, a Holocaust survivor, was kicked in the groin by protesters and Rabbi Howard Joseph and his wife Norma were assaulted and spat on. Protestors broke into the building through a side door but were blocked on the escalators by police and began hurling furniture from the mezzanine to the lobby. The police responded by firing pepper spray, which caused the Hall building to be evacuated and classes canceled for the remainder of the day. 

Around 1 p.m., a large window was shattered by rioters. At approximately the same time, a second window on the building's first floor, on the western side was broken when rioters threw a metal barricade. Five demonstrators were arrested, including VP of the student council Aaron Maté, and an additional twelve faced internal disciplinary hearings under the University's Code of Rights and Responsibilities. 

Netanyahu was not present at the protest, having remained at Montreal's Ritz-Carlton Hotel throughout the duration. He later accused the activists of supporting terrorism and "mad zealotry." "They're supporting Saddam Hussein, they're supporting [Yasser] Arafat, they're supporting [Osama] Bin Laden," he added.

In the wake of the riot, the university instituted additional measures to avert future incidents, including the banning of any events related to the Israeli–Palestinian conflict for one month, as well as enabling the use of new student disciplinary rules in case of emergency. 

The National Film Board of Canada documentary Discordia, produced by Adam Symansky, documents the fallout from the riot by following three young Concordia campus activists. In 2003 GlobalTV also aired the documentary Confrontation at Concordia, produced by Martin Himel. Raymond Beauchemin, a 1992 Concordia University graduate (MA, English), wrote a novel, These Days Are Nights, inspired by the events of the protest.

References

Student protests in Canada
Concordia University
Israeli–Palestinian conflict
2000s in Montreal
2002 in Quebec
Riots and civil disorder in Canada
Anti-Zionism in Canada
Antisemitism in Canada
New antisemitism